Luna 27 (Luna-Resurs 1 lander or Luna-Resource-1 lander) is a planned lunar lander mission by the Roscosmos with collaboration by the European Space Agency (ESA) to send a lander to the South Pole–Aitken basin, an area on the far side of the Moon. Its objective will be to detect and characterise lunar polar volatiles. The mission is a continuation of the Luna-Glob programme.

Mission 
The purpose is to prospect for minerals, volatiles (nitrogen, water, carbon dioxide, ammonia, hydrogen, methane and sulfur dioxide, and lunar water ice in permanently shadowed areas of the Moon and investigate the potential use of these natural lunar resources. On the long term, Russia considers building a crewed base on the Moon's far side that would bring scientific and commercial benefits.

Europe's participation in the mission received final approval at a meeting of ministers in December 2016. European Space Agency (ESA) will contribute with the development of a new type of automated landing system, and will also be providing the 'PROSPECT' package, consisting of a drill (ProSEED), sample handling, and an analysis package (ProSPA). The scientific payload consists of fifteen instruments.

The lander mission was announced in November 2014 by Russia, and its launch is planned for August 2025.

Science payload 
The lander will feature 15 science instruments that will analyse the regolith, plasma in the exosphere, dust, and seismic activity.

The European Space Agency payloads under collaboration with Russia was planned to fly Package for Resource Observation and in-Situ Prospecting for Exploration, Commercial exploitation and Transportation (PROSPECT) program's ProSEED lunar sampling drill, ProSPA chemical laboratory and volatile analysis package  and Exospheric Mass Spectrometer L-band (EMS-L) high-performance communications payload on this mission, but the ProSEED and ProSPA will now fly on a NASA CLPS mission in 2025 and the EMS-L will now fly on JAXA/ISRO's LUPEX lunar rover mission in 2024 due to continued international collaboration being thrown into doubt by the 2022 Russian invasion of Ukraine and related sanctions on Russia.

The notional instrument payload includes:
 ADRON-LR, active neutron and gamma-ray analysis of regolith
 ARIES-L, measurement of plasma in the exosphere
 LASMA-LR, laser mass-spectrometer
 LIS-TV-RPM, infrared spectrometry of minerals and imaging
 LINA, measurement of plasma and neutrals
 PmL, measurement of dust and micro-meteorites
 Radio beacon, high-power radio communication
 RAT, radio measurements of the thermal properties of the regolith
 SEISMO-LR, seismometer
 Spectrometer, UV and optical imaging of mineral composition
 THERMO-L, measurement of the thermal properties of regolith
 STS-L, panoramic and local imaging
 Laser retroreflector, Moon libration and ranging experiments
 BUNI, power and science data support

See also 

 Lunar water
 Russian lunar manned spacecraft

References

External links 
 Lunar and Planetary Department Moscow University
 Soviet Luna Chronology
 Exploring the Moon: Luna Missions

Missions to the Moon
Russian space probes
Russian lunar exploration program
2025 in Russia
2025 in spaceflight
Proposed space probes